The Mercure Liverpool Atlantic Tower Hotel (previously known as Atlantic Tower Hotel (The Hotel Collection), Thistle Liverpool, Thistle Atlantic Tower or the Thistle Hotel) is a large 4-star hotel located in Liverpool, England. Opened in 1972, it is situated on Chapel Street next to Saint Nicholas' Church and near the Royal Liver Building on the city's famous Pier Head. The building was designed to resemble the prow of a ship to reflect Liverpool's maritime history.

Gallery

See also
 Architecture of Liverpool
 Thistle Hotels

References 

Hotels in Liverpool
Buildings and structures in Merseyside
Buildings and structures completed in 1972
Hotels established in 1972
Hotel buildings completed in 1972